Gaiķi Parish is an administrative unit of Saldus Municipality, Latvia. The administrative center is Satiķi village.

Towns, villages and settlements of Gaiķi parish 
 Gaiķi
 Lielsatiķi
 Muižciems
 Satiķi
 Vecgaiķi

References

External links 
 

Parishes of Latvia
Saldus Municipality
Courland